The 1990–91 Boston Bruins season was the Bruins' 67th season. The season involved participating in the Prince of Wales Conference finals.

Offseason

NHL Draft
Boston's draft picks at the 1990 NHL Entry Draft held at the BC Place in Vancouver, British Columbia.

Regular season

Final standings

Schedule and results

Player statistics

Regular season
Scoring

Goaltending

Playoffs
Scoring

Goaltending

Playoffs

Adams Division Semifinals

Boston Bruins 4, Hartford Whalers 2

Adams Division Finals

Boston Bruins 4, Montreal Canadiens 3

Wales Conference Finals

Pittsburgh Penguins 4, Boston Bruins 2

Awards and honors

References
 Bruins on Hockey Database

Boston Bruins seasons
Boston Bruins
Boston Bruins
Adams Division champion seasons
Boston Bruins
Boston Bruins
Bruins
Bruins